Jhon Franky Montaño Sinisterra (born 7 May 1997), also known as John Montaño, is a Colombian footballer.

Career 
Montaño played with América de Cali, playing for the U-20 team and appearing for the first-team in the Copa Colombia in 2016 and 2017. He joined United Soccer League side Rio Grande Valley FC Toros in March 2018.

He made his professional debut on 16 March 2018, playing in a 1-1 draw with Saint Louis FC.

Notes

References

External links 
 
 John Montaño at Rio Grande Valley FC Toros
 

1997 births
Living people
Colombian footballers
Colombian expatriate footballers
Expatriate soccer players in the United States
Expatriate footballers in Chile
Association football forwards
América de Cali footballers
Rio Grande Valley FC Toros players
Santiago Morning footballers
USL Championship players
Primera B de Chile players
People from Tumaco
Sportspeople from Nariño Department